Felix Tekusch (11 May 1889 – 21 May 1916) was an Austrian footballer. He played in nine matches for the Austria national football team from 1910 to 1914. He was also part of Austria's squad for the football tournament at the 1912 Summer Olympics, but he did not play in any matches. He was killed in action during World War I.

References

External links
 

1889 births
1916 deaths
Austrian footballers
Austria international footballers
Place of birth missing
Association football defenders
Austro-Hungarian military personnel killed in World War I
Wiener AC players
Wiener AF players